Orwig is a surname. Notable people with the surname include:

Bernice Orwig (born 1976), American water polo player
Bill Orwig (1907–1994), American football and basketball player
Matthew D. Orwig (born 1959), American attorney
William W. Orwig (1810–1889), American Evangelical bishop